Soul Battle is an album by American saxophonists Oliver Nelson, King Curtis and Jimmy Forrest. Recorded in 1960 and originally released by the Prestige label in 1962, it was reissued on CD in 1991, featuring one additional track.

Track listing
All tracks composed by Oliver Nelson; except where noted.
"Blues at the Five Spot" - 5:43 
"Blues for M.F. (Mort Fega)" - 9:37 
"Anacruses" - 5:43 
 "Perdido" (Juan Tizol) - 9:22 
"In Passing" - 7:31 
"Soul Street" (Jimmy Forrest) - 9:07 Bonus track on CD reissue

Personnel
Oliver Nelson, King Curtis, Jimmy Forrest - tenor saxophone
Gene Casey - piano
George Duvivier - bass
Roy Haynes - drums

References

Prestige Records albums
Oliver Nelson albums
1962 albums
Albums produced by Esmond Edwards
Albums recorded at Van Gelder Studio